Hizabad-e Bala (also Romanized as Hīzābād-e Bālā) is a village in Zaboli Rural District, in the Central District of Mehrestan County, Sistan and Baluchestan Province, Iran. At the 2006 census, its population was 453, in 110 families.

References 

Populated places in Mehrestan County